Fairchild Media is a publisher of fashion trade magazines, websites, and conferences for the fashion, retail and beauty industries. Fairchild Media brands include Women’s Wear Daily, Footwear News (FN), Beauty Inc, M and Fairchild Summits.

History
Fairchild Publications was founded in 1892 when Edmund Fairchild, a peddler, took over the Daily Trade Record (later the Daily News Record and DNR), a failing newspaper that covered the men's clothing business. In June 1910, an insert called "Women's Wear" first appeared in the Record; a month later, Fairchild published it as a standalone publication, known today as Women's Wear Daily. John Fairchild, grandson of Edmund Fairchild  assumed management of Women’s Wear Daily in 1955 and transformed it from a trade journal to a leading fashion and cultural newspaper.

In 1968, the company—then named Fairchild Publications—was purchased by Capital Cities Communications. In 1996, The Walt Disney Company acquired Capital Cities/ABC. In 1997, Disney announced its intention to sell Fairchild, but it wasn't until 1999 that it sold Fairchild to Advance Publications, the parent company of Condé Nast Publications, for $650 million.

In 2005, Advance Publications folded Fairchild into Condé Nast Publications and rebranded the division as the Fairchild Fashion Group. In 2008, it folded DNR.

In 2010, Fairchild launched Menswear and took over the consumer-centric Style.com, previously part of Condé Nast Publications. In 2011, Fairchild Fashion Group was renamed Fairchild Fashion Media; in October of that year, FFM launched Style.com/Print, a print magazine extension of the brand. In 2012, FFM sold its Fairchild Books division to Bloomsbury Publishing for $6.5 million. The same year, it acquired Fashion Networks International, a blog network with contributors that included Anna Dello Russo, Bryanboy, Rumi Neely, and Derek Blasberg.

In August 2014, Advance Publications announced that it would sell FFM, save for Style.com and NowManifest, to Penske Media Corp. for $100 million.

Publications

Over the years, the company's portfolio has included the following publications:

 American Metal Market
 Beauty Inc.
 Details
 Electronic News
 Footwear News
 Golf Pro Merchandising
 Home Furnishings Daily
 Jane
 M (1983-1992; 2012–present)
 Men'sWeek
 Metalworking News
 Style.com
 Style.com/Print
 Supermarket News
 SportStyle
 Children's Business

References

External links
 

Mass media companies of the United States
Fashion industry
Penske Media Corporation
Former subsidiaries of The Walt Disney Company
American companies established in 1892
Publishing companies established  in 1892